Diaphanidae is a taxonomic family of small sea snails, marine opisthobranch gastropod molluscs or micromollusks in the superfamily Diaphanoidea, the headshield slugs and bubble snails.

The little-known species in this family have small, flimsy, almost globular shells, known as paper bubble gastropod shells.

Distribution
Species in this family are found in cold seas, such as the Arctic region, Antarctica, Australia, and New Zealand.

Habitat
The species occur in the sublittoral to abyssal zones.

Shell description
The shell is minute, thin, fragile, colorless to translucent, and usually less than 5 mm in size. The overall shape is ovate, pear-shaped, and bulbous. There is a sunken apex.

Genera
Genera within the family Diaphanidae include:

Subfamily Diaphaninae 
Genus Austrodiaphana Pilsbry, 1893
Austrodiaphan brazieri Angas, 1877
Distribution : Western Australia
Length : 8 mm
Austrodiaphana colei Fleming, 1948
Distribution : New Zealand
Austrodiaphana flemingi Powell, 1952
Distribution : New Zealand
Austrodiaphana maunganuica Powell, 1952
Distribution : New Zealand
Genus Colobocephalus Sars M., 1870
Colobocephalus costellatus, Sars M., 1870
Colobocephalus striatulus Monterosato ex Jeffreys, 1874
Distribution : Mediterranean
Genus Colpodaspis M. Sars, 1870 (incertae sedis) The sole of the foot contains a gland that secretes a mucous fluid, which helps the little animal to stay attached to stems and algae.
Colpodaspis punctata Clark, 1837
Distribution : Mediterranean
Colpodaspis pusilla Sars, 1870
Distribution : Southern Norway, Great Britain, western Ireland
Length : 5 mm
Description : the bubble shell is completely enclosed by the mantle; two prominent rhinophores on the head, leading to a groove along each side of the head; right posterior siphon
Colpodaspis thompsoni Brown, 1979
Distribution : tropical Indo-Pacific, Okinawa, Christmas Island
Length : 3 mm
Description : black sea slug with yellow warts on a white background; the mantle encloses the bubble-shaped fragile shell; there is a pair of enrolled rhinophores on the head; the eyes are the two black spots on the head, just in front of the shell;
Genus Diaphana Brown, 1827
Diaphana abyssalis T. Schiøtte, 1998
Distribution : Western Atlantic
Diaphana anderssoni H. Strebel, 1908
Distribution : South Georgia
Diaphana caribaea Espinosa, J., J.Ortea & J.Magaña, 2001
Distribution : Cuba
Length : 2 mm
Diaphana cretica
Distribution : Mediterranean
Diaphana expansa (Jeffreys, 1864)
Distribution : Norway to the Scilly Isles.
Diaphana floridana Dall, 1927
Distribution : Georgia
Length : 4 mm
Diaphana globosa Lovén, 1846
Distribution : Scandinavia
Length : 4 mm
Diaphana haini Linse, K. & T. Schiøtte, 2002
Distribution : Antarctica
Length : 2.2 mm
Diaphana hiemalis (Couthouy, J.P., 1839) (synonym of Diaphana minuta)
Diaphana inflata (Strebel, H., 1908)
Distribution : South Georgia
Length : 2.4 mm
Diaphana lactea Jeffreys, 1877
Distribution : Mediterranean, Norway
Diaphana lottae K.J. Bush, 1893
Distribution : North Carolina
Length : 8.5 mm
Diaphana makarovi G.B. Gorbunov, 1946
Distribution : East Greenland
Length : 3 mm
Diaphana mauretaniensis T. Schiøtte, 1998
Distribution : Mauretania
Diaphana minuta Brown, 1827
Distribution : Greenland, Scandinavia, Iceland, Scotland, North Spain down to the Canaries and the Mediterranean, Massachusetts.
Length: 5.8 mm
Description : found in sandy bottoms from the low tide level to a depth of 350 m; thin, fragile, smooth, cylindrical shell with convex whorls. The body whorl is prominent. Minute apex. Deep suture between the whorls. Deep umbilicus.
Diaphana pacifica T. Schiøtte, 1998
Distribution : Southern California
Diaphana paessleri H. Strebel, 1905
Distribution : Falklands; Tierra del Fuego; South Georgia; South Orkneys; Weddell Sea, Antarctica; Kerguelen.
Length : 3.3 mm
Diaphana pfefferi H. Strebel, 1905
Distribution : South Georgia
Length : 2.9 mm
Diaphana quadrata
Distribution : Mediterranean
Diaphana seguenzae R.B. Watson, 1886
Distribution : NE Brazil
Length : 3.8 mm
Genus Newnesia E. A. Smith, 1902 (incertae sedis)
Newnesia antarctica E. A. Smith, 1902
Distribution : Weddell Sea (Antarctica)
Length : 17–30 mm
Newnesia sphinx Strebel H., 1908
Distribution : Paulet Insel (Antarctic Peninsula)
Length : 24.8 mm
Genus Rhinodiaphana Lemche, 1967
Rhinodiaphana ventricosa Jeffreys, 1865
Genus Woodbridgea Berry, 1953
Woodbridgea polystrigma Dall, 1908 (furrowed paper-bubble)
Distribution : America
 Woodbridgea williamsi S.S. Berry, 1953
Distribution : West-America

Subfamily Toledoniinae 
 Bogasonia Warén, 1989
Bogasonia gorjachevi Chaban, 1998 - Distribution: Kurile Islands.
Bogasonia volutoides Warén, 1989 - Distribution: Iceland. Found at depths between 100–200 m.
Toledonia Dall, 1902

References

External links 
 
 Bois-Reymond Marcus, E. D. (1976): A taxonomic survey of the genus Toledonia Dall, 1902 (Opistobranchia, Diaphanidae). Zool. Scripta 5: 25-33
 Photo of Colpodaspis thompsoni